The Battle of Fort Apache was an engagement of the Apache Wars between the cavalry garrison of Fort Apache and dozens of mounted White Mountain Apache warriors. The battle occurred in eastern Arizona Territory on September 1, 1881.

Battle
The native attack on Fort Apache, which was commanded by Colonel Eugene Asa Carr, was a counter-attack in reprisal for the Battle of Cibecue Creek, in which  medicine man Nochaydelklinne was killed.  Some Arizona historians would consider the attack on Fort Apache to be a continuation of the Cibecue Creek engagement, but the two battles occurred about 40 miles from each other on opposite sides of the Fort Apache Reservation and occurred two days apart.  The Apache army repeatedly attacked the fort from a long range with their rifles near Whiteriver, Arizona, firing volleys and scoring some hits.

The U.S. cavalry and native allies fought back, but the Apache remained at the end of their rifle range during the entire fight. The battle lasted until sunset after several Apache attacks had been repulsed by counter fire. Two days later, reinforcements from Fort Thomas on the San Carlos Indian Reservation arrived, but by this time, the Apaches had already retreated into hiding. Only three American soldiers were wounded and Apache casualties are unknown.

Aftermath
As result of Nochaydelklinne's death and the siege of the fort, other Apache groups decided to abandon their recently established reservations and join Geronimo and other leaders for war, or to escape to northern Mexico. The two separate engagements at Cibecue Creek and Fort Apache helped ignite another Apache war in Arizona Territory, which would end with the surrender of Geronimo at Skeleton Canyon five years later in 1886.

The site was listed in the 1998 World Monuments Watch by the World Monuments Fund. The fund subsequently provided financial assistance for the development of master plan for the fort's historic building through financial-services company American Express.

See also
 American Indian Wars

References

Further reading
 Davis, Britton. The Truth about Geronimo New Haven: Yale Press 1929
 Geronimo (edited by Barrett). Geronimo, His Own Story New York: Ballantine Books 1971
 Kaywaykla, James (edited Eve Ball). In the Days of Victorio: Recollections of a Warm Springs Apache Tucson: University of Arizona Press 1970
 Lavender, David. The Rockies. Revised Edition. New York: Harper & Row, 1975.
 Limerick, Patricia Nelson. The Legacy of Conquest: The Unbroken Past of the American West. New York: W.W. Norton, 1987.
 Smith, Duane A. Rocky Mountain West: Colorado, Wyoming, & Montana, 1859–1915. Albuquerque: University of New Mexico Press, 1992.
 
 Williams, Albert N. Rocky Mountain Country. New York: Duell, Sloan & Pearce, 1950.

Fort Apache
Fort Apache
Arizona Territory
History of United States expansionism
19th-century military history of the United States
Apache Wars
1881 in Arizona Territory
September 1881 events